Occupation of Coxim was a Paraguayan military operation led by Colonel Francisco Isidoro Resquín that resulted in the capture of the village of Coxim, now Mato Grosso do Sul, during the Paraguayan War. Colonel Resquín detached 300 soldiers and some cannons from Miranda, the base camp for the invaders, and headed for the village. The column advanced on horseback and encountered great difficulties in the 120 kilometers of almost impassable terrain. On April 24, 1865, Resquín's column reached the village and found it almost abandoned. Coxim's defense was in charge of only seven Brazilian squares, under the command of retired captain Antônio Pedro dos Santos. The fight was fast and without casualties on the Paraguayan side. The resisters withdrew to Cuiabá and the invaders looted and burned the village. On their return, Paraguayan troops lost 50 soldiers to diseases and injuries from the march.

Panic started in Cuiabá when the news of the fall of Coxim arrived. It was said that the Paraguayans were marching to the capital with 8,000 soldiers and a large number of cannons and horses, which never occurred.

References

Bibliography

Coxim
Coxim
Coxim
1864 in Brazil
April 1864 events
Military occupation
History of Mato Grosso do Sul